The 2006 European Figure Skating Championships were a senior international figure skating competition in the 2005–06 season. Medals were awarded in the disciplines of men's singles, ladies' singles, pair skating, and ice dancing. The event was held at the Palais des Sports de Gerland in Lyon, France, from January 17 to 22, 2006.

Qualifying
The competition was open to skaters from European ISU member nations who reached the age of 15 before July 1, 2005. The corresponding competition for non-European skaters was the 2006 Four Continents Championships. Based on the results of the 2005 European Championships, each country was allowed between one and three entries per discipline. National associations selected their entries based on their own criteria.

Medals table

Overview
Russia swept all four gold medals.

In men's singles, Russia's Evgeni Plushenko won his fifth European title. Switzerland's Stéphane Lambiel and France's Brian Joubert won silver and bronze respectively.

Russia's Irina Slutskaya won a record seventh European ladies' title, which put her ahead of Katarina Witt and Sonja Henie. Teammate Elena Sokolova took silver and Italy's Carolina Kostner the bronze.

In the pairs' event, Russia's Tatiana Totmianina / Maxim Marinin won their fifth consecutive European title. Germany's Aliona Savchenko / Robin Szolkowy took silver and Russia's Maria Petrova / Alexei Tikhonov the bronze. The Czech Republic's Olga Prokuronova / Karel Štefl, who were 10th in the short program, suffered a fall on a lift in the free skate. Prokuronova lay on the ice for several seconds before Štefl helped her to her feet and she exited the ice. They withdrew from the event. An ISU doctor said Prokuronova had not sustained a serious injury but was taken to the hospital for further examination.

In ice dancing, Russia's Tatiana Navka / Roman Kostomarov trailed in the compulsory dance but rebounded in the original and free dances to take their third consecutive European title, while Ukraine's Elena Grushina / Ruslan Goncharov won silver and Lithuania's Margarita Drobiazko / Povilas Vanagas the bronze.

Results

Men

Ladies

Pairs

Ice dancing

References

External links
 
 Eurosport's page about the Championships
 Photos of the European Championships 2006

European Figure Skating Championships, 2006
European Figure Skating Championships, 2006
European Figure Skating Championships
E
International figure skating competitions hosted by France
European Figure Skating Championships
European Figure Skating Championships, 2006